
Gmina Stężyca is a rural gmina (administrative district) in Kartuzy County, Pomeranian Voivodeship, in northern Poland.

Villages
Gmina Stężyca contains the villages and settlements of Betlejem, Bolwerk, Borucino, Chróstowo, Czapielski Młyn, Czysta Woda, Dąbniak, Dąbrowa, Danachowo, Delowo, Drozdowo, Dubowo, Gapowo, Gołubie, Gołubie-Wybudowanie, Kamienica Szlachecka, Kamienny Dół, Klukowa Huta, Kolano, Krzeszna, Krzeszna-Stacja, Kucborowo, Kukówka, Łączyno, Łączyński Młyn, Mała Krzeszna, Malbork, Mestwin, Niebo, Niesiołowice, Nowa Sikorska Huta, Nowa Wieś, Nowe Czaple, Nowe Łosienice, Nowy Ostrów, Ostrowo, Pażęce, Piekło, Pierszczewko, Pierszczewo, Potuły, Przyrowie, Pustka, Pypkowo, Rzepiska, Sikorzyno, Smokowo, Stara Sikorska Huta, Stare Czaple, Stare Łosienice, Stężyca, Stężyca-Wybudowanie, Stężycka Huta, Szczukowo, Szymbark, Teklowo, Uniradze, Wieżyca, Wygoda Łączyńska, Zdrębowo, Zgorzałe and Żuromino.

Neighbouring gminas
Gmina Stężyca is bordered by the gminas of Chmielno, Kartuzy, Kościerzyna, Sierakowice, Somonino and Sulęczyno.

References
 Polish official population figures 2006

Stezyca
Kartuzy County